Pseudodactylogyridae is a family of flatworms belonging to the order Dactylogyridea.

Genera:
 Peudodiclidophora Yamaguti, 1965
 Pseudodactylogyrus Gusev, 1965
 Pseudodiclidophora Yamaguti, 1965

References

Platyhelminthes